Bound And Gagged is a one-panel comic strip drawn by Dana Summers and syndicated by Tribune Content Agency.

References

External links
Bound And Gagged at GoComics

Comic strips missing date information
Comic strips syndicated by Tribune Content Agency